Emmet County is the name of two counties in the United States:

Emmet County, Iowa 
Emmet County, Michigan